Nannamukku  is a village in Malappuram district in the state of Kerala, India.

Demographics
 India census, Nannamukku had a population of 26669 with 12470 males and 14199 females.

Transportation
Nannamukku village connects to other parts of India through Kuttippuram town.  National highway No.66 passes through Edappal and the northern stretch connects to Goa and Mumbai.  The southern stretch connects to Cochin and Trivandrum.   National Highway No.966 connects to Palakkad and Coimbatore.  The nearest airport is at Kozhikode.  The nearest major railway station is at Kuttippuram.

References

External links
Nannammukku Gramapanchayat 

Villages in Malappuram district
Kuttippuram area